Glimpse or Glimpses may refer to:

 Glimpse: Live Recordings from Around the World, an album by Sonicflood
 The Glimpse, an album by Robert Mitchell
 Glimpse EP, an album by Trapt
Glimpse (software), a photo editor forked from GIMP

GLIMPSE may refer to:

 GLIMPSE Project, project to investigate thinning at the margin of the Greenland Ice Sheet
 The Galactic Legacy Infrared Mid-Plane Survey Extraordinaire, an astronomical survey performed by the Spitzer Space Telescope
 a knowledge-based front-end for the statistical software package GLIM

Glimpses may refer to:
 Glimpses: A Collection of Nightrunner Short Stories, 2010 book by Lynn Flewelling
 Glimpses, 1993 book by Lewis Shiner